Bajkul Milani Mahavidyalaya, also known as Bajkul College, established in 1964, is one of the oldest colleges in Purba Medinipur district. It offers undergraduate courses in arts and sciences.  It is affiliated to  Vidyasagar University.

History
Bajkul Milani Mahavidyalaya was founded on 3 September 1964 as a Government Sponsored College under Calcutta University. It has come under the purview of Vidyasagar University in 1985.

Location
The rural college is situated in Purba Medinipur district in West Bengal. It stands on the Egra road and is adjacent to the Digha road. The Tamluk-Digha rail line embraces the college, and the Deshapran station is near the main entrance.

Departments

Science
Automobile Maintenance
 Chemistry
 Physics
 Mathematics
 Botany
 Zoology
 Physiology
 Economics

Arts
 Bengali
 English
 Sanskrit
 Geography
 History
 Political Science
 Philosophy
 Sociology
 Music
 Physical Education

Accreditation
Recently, Bajkul Milani Mahavidyalaya has been awarded B grade by the National Assessment and Accreditation Council (NAAC). The college is also recognized by the University Grants Commission (UGC).

See also
List of institutions of higher education in West Bengal
Education in India
Education in West Bengal

References

External links
Yogoda Satsanga Palpara Mahavidyalaya
Vidyasagar University
University Grants Commission
National Assessment and Accreditation Council

Colleges affiliated to Vidyasagar University
Educational institutions established in 1964
Universities and colleges in Purba Medinipur district
1964 establishments in West Bengal